Kenema Town Field, is a mini-stadium located in Kenema, Sierra Leone. It is mostly used for soccer games and it also the home field of Kamboi Eagles football club.

References
Football Ground Map

Football venues in Sierra Leone
Kenema